Sail Away is an album by Randy Newman, released on May 23, 1972. It was produced by Lenny Waronker and Russ Titelman and issued on Reprise Records. While all of its songs were written and composed by Newman, several had already been recorded by other artists.

Composition
As with all of Newman's early albums, several of its songs had been previously recorded by other artists. In this case, "Simon Smith and the Amazing Dancing Bear" had been a UK hit for Alan Price in 1967 and was recorded by Harry Nilsson on his 1969 album Harry. "Dayton, Ohio - 1903" had been recorded by Billy J. Kramer as a single in 1969, while Newman and Nilsson recorded a version together for Nilsson's 1970 album Nilsson Sings Newman. Newman himself had also previously recorded "Last Night I Had a Dream" as a single, issued in September 1968. The version heard on Sail Away is a re-recording with a notably different arrangement.

"You Can Leave Your Hat On" was later recorded by Joe Cocker in 1986 and this version was featured on the soundtrack of the 1986 film 9½ Weeks starring Kim Basinger. A version by Tom Jones appeared on the soundtrack of the 1997 film The Full Monty.

"He Gives Us All His Love" was also initially written and recorded by Newman in a sparser and slower arrangement for the 1971 film Cold Turkey.  The film issued no soundtrack album, and the first commercially available recordings of this song were issued by Sundance (March 1971) and Ed Ames (October 1971).

The song "Lonely at the Top" was written specifically with Frank Sinatra in mind, although he never recorded it. Newman himself had already released it (in a solo live performance) on his previous album, Randy Newman Live (1971).

Reissue
The album was reissued by Rhino Records on May 5, 2002, with several previously unreleased bonus tracks.

Legacy

In 2000 Sail Away was voted number 582 in Colin Larkin's All Time Top 1000 Albums. That same year, it was ranked number 268 on Rolling Stone magazine's list of the 500 Greatest Albums of All Time.

Brian Wilson has said that this album profoundly affected him at the time of its release, briefly keeping him from sliding further into depression and mental illness. In particular, Wilson noted that he listened to Sail Away "over and over" while physically writing down the lyrics which would become the Beach Boys' Mount Vernon and Fairway fairy tale EP. In 2021, Wilson ranked Sail Away third on his list of "5 Albums I Can't Live Without" for Spin magazine.

"Burn On" is heard over the opening credits of the 1989 movie Major League. According to the film's director, David S. Ward, he chose the song because it was the only one he knew of that was about Cleveland, Ohio, which is where the movie takes place. The chorus of the song, "burn on, big river, burn on," refers to when the Cuyahoga River caught fire due to pollution in 1969.

The song "Old Man" can be heard in the closing credits of Noah Baumbach's 2017 film The Meyerowitz Stories.

Track listing

Charts

Personnel

Randy Newman – piano, vocals
Ry Cooder – slide guitar on "Last Night I Had a Dream" and "You Can Leave Your Hat On"
Russ Titelman – guitar
Jim Keltner – drums
Gene Parsons – drums
Earl Palmer – drums
Chris Ethridge – bass guitar
Wilton Felder – bass guitar
Jimmy Bond – bass guitar
Milt Holland – percussion
Louis Kaufman – concertmaster
Abe Most – alto saxophone on "Lonely at the Top"

Technical

Lenny Waronker – co-producer
Russ Titelman – co-producer
Randy Newman – arranger
Emil Newman – conductor on "Sail Away" and "Burn On"
Larry Marks – conductor on "Old Man"
Lee Herschberg – engineer, mixing
Bruce Botnick – engineer
Bob Kovach – engineer
Donn Landee – engineer
Harold "Lanky" Linstrot – engineer
Judy Maizel – production assistant
Trudy Portch – production assistant
Mike Salisbury – graphics, photography

References

1972 albums
Randy Newman albums
Albums produced by Lenny Waronker
Albums produced by Russ Titelman
Reprise Records albums
Rhino Records albums
Self-covers albums
Albums recorded at United Western Recorders
Albums arranged by Randy Newman
Albums conducted by Randy Newman